Sayed Ebrahim Dibaj is an Iranian philosopher, author, and an emeritus professor of philosophy at the University of Tehran. During his academic career, including 46 years of teaching philosophy, Dibaj authored many books on philosophy that were published by the University of Tehran Press.

References

External links 
 Articles on noormags.com
 Author Dr. Dibaj, Book: First "Badieh"
 Author Dr. Dibaj, Book: Selection from Holy Book , Tradition and Speeches
 Dr. Dibaj listed as former Director of Library of the University of Tehran

Academic staff of the University of Tehran